Peter Simons may refer to:
Peter Simons (academic) (born 1950), British philosopher and academic
Peter Simons (businessman) (born 1964), Canadian businessman

See also
Peter Simon (disambiguation)
Peter Symonds (disambiguation)